The fourth World Chess Championship was held in Havana between January 1 and February 28, 1892. Defending champion William Steinitz narrowly defeated challenger Mikhail Chigorin.

This was Steinitz' fourth successive world championship match victory, and his second against Chigorin. He had previously defeated Johannes Zukertort in 1886, Chigorin in 1889 and Isidor Gunsberg in 1891.

Match

{| class="wikitable" style="text-align:center"
|+World Chess Championship Match 1892
|-
! !! width=15|1 !! width=15|2 !! width=15|3 !! width=15|4 !! width=15|5 !! width=15|6 !! width=15|7 !! width=15|8 !! width=15|9 !! width=15|10 !! width=15|11 !! width=15|12 !! width=15|13 !! width=15|14 !! width=15|15 !! width=15|16 !! width=15|17 !! width=15|18 !! width=15|19 !! width=15|20 !! width=15|21 !! width=15|22 !! width=15|23 !! Points !! Wins
|-
| align=left | 
| 1 ||style="background:black; color:white"| ½ || ½ ||style="background:black; color:white"| 0 || ½ ||style="background:black; color:white"| 0 || 1 ||style="background:black; color:white"| 1 || ½ ||style="background:black; color:white"| 1 || 0 ||style="background:black; color:white"| 1 || 0 ||style="background:black; color:white"| 0 || 1 ||style="background:black; color:white"| 0 || 1 ||style="background:black; color:white"| 0 || 1  ||style="background:black; color:white"| 0 || ½   ||style="background:black; color:white"| 0 || 0 || 10½ || 8
|-
| align=left | 
|style="background:black; color:white"| 0 || ½ ||style="background:black; color:white"| ½ || 1 ||style="background:black; color:white"| ½ || 1 ||style="background:black; color:white"| 0 || 0 ||style="background:black; color:white"| ½ || 0 || style="background:black; color:white"| 1 || 0 ||style="background:black; color:white"| 1 || 1 ||style="background:black; color:white"| 0 || 1 ||style="background:black; color:white"| 0 || 1 ||style="background:black; color:white"| 0 || 1 ||style="background:black; color:white"| ½ || 1 ||style="background:black; color:white"| 1 || 12½ || 10
|}
The match was to last twenty games; the first player to score 10½ points or win ten games would be the champion. In the event of a 10–10 tie after 20 games the players would continue until one of them had won ten games. If it reached a score of nine wins each, the match would end in a draw and the defending champion Steinitz would retain the title. After twenty games the score was 10–10 with each player having eight wins, so the players continued until one had won ten games.  Game 21 was drawn, but Steinitz won games 22 and 23 to win the match and retain the title.

Decisive mistakes
With the match tied at 8-8 after 21 games, Steinitz won the match after blunders by Chigorin in the next two games.

In game 22 Chigorin blundered on move 9 losing a pawn and ultimately the game. (See diagram 1.) Playing black, Chigorin adopted the variation of the Queen's Gambit Declined later known as the Tartakower Defense.  9. cxd5 Nxd5? An elementary error that loses a pawn. 10. Nxd5 Bxd5 11. Bxe7 Qxe7 12. Rxc7 Qd6 13. Rc3 Bxa2? When making his 9th move Chigorin may have expected this  capture would regain the pawn, but after 14 e4 the bishop was trapped. Play continued 14... Qb4 15. Qa1 Bb3 16. Nd2 Bc2 17. Rc4 Qd6 18. Rxc2 Qxd4. Down a piece for a pawn, Chigorin's position was lost, though he played on until resigning after White's 49th move.

As White in game 23, Chigorin was behind eight wins to nine and played the aggressive King's Gambit. Steinitz defended poorly and was in a hopeless endgame (see diagram 2).  A piece up, Chigorin should have won after 32. Rxb7 (32...Rxd5? 33. Nf4 forks the black rooks).  Instead the game and match ended suddenly when Chigorin blundered with 32. Bb4?? Rxh2+ White resigns, as Black will mate on the next move (33 Kg1 Rdg2#). By missing a mate in 2, this is regarded as one of the worst ever blunders in World Championship play.

References

External links
1892 Steinitz - Chigorin Title Match at www.mark-weeks.com
Steinitz - Chigorin World Championship Rematch (1892) - All games and details at Chessgames.com

1892
1892 in chess
1892 in Cuba
Chess in Cuba
Sport in Havana
19th century in Havana